Christopher Andrew Tsangarides (17 August 1956 – 6 January 2018) was a British record producer, sound engineer, and mixer of Greek Cypriot origin. He was best known for his work with many heavy metal artists, including Gary Moore, Thin Lizzy, Judas Priest, Helloween, Anvil, Angra, Anthem, Yngwie Malmsteen, and Tygers of Pan Tang.  

Tsangarides worked with many pop and alternative artists as well, including Depeche Mode, Tom Jones, Concrete Blonde, and the Tragically Hip.

Career
Chris Tsangarides learned to play piano as a child and studied trumpet at the Royal Academy of Music, before studying economics at college. He started his career in the music business in 1974, as an apprentice at Morgan Studios in London, one of the major independent recording studios in the UK at the time. Initially, he worked there as a tape operator and his first job as sound engineer was on Judas Priest's second album Sad Wings of Destiny in 1976. He engineered the British hit single "Naughty Naughty Naughty" in 1977, a pop song by Joy Sarney, whose success gave him much more work as engineer at the studio. In that period he engineered and mixed albums of new wave acts, such as Japan's Obscure Alternatives (1978), and jazz fusion releases of Colosseum II and Brand X. Tsangarides befriended Colosseum II guitarist Gary Moore, who asked him to produce his solo album Back on the Streets (1978), which was Tsangarides's first job as producer. The song "Parisienne Walkways", sung on the album by Thin Lizzy's Phil Lynott, was a hit in the UK. Tsangarides continued working with Moore on live albums and produced Back to the Blues in 2001.

When Morgan Studios 3 and 4 were acquired by Zomba Management in 1980 and rechristened Battery Studios, Tsangarides was hired by the new owners as part of a team of "in-house producers" which included Robert John "Mutt" Lange, Martin Birch, Tony Platt and Nigel Green.

During the 1980s and up to the 1990s, Tsangarides became notable on the hard rock and heavy metal scene for the quality of his job and for having produced signature albums, such as Anvil's Metal on Metal in 1982, Thin Lizzy's acclaimed final studio release Thunder and Lightning in 1983 and the Grammy nominated Painkiller by Judas Priest in 1990. He worked in those years with Black Sabbath, Ozzy Osbourne, Helloween, Y&T, Tygers of Pan Tang, Anthem, Sinner, King Diamond, Ian Gillan, and produced also Bruce Dickinson's first solo album Tattooed Millionaire (1990).

Beside his work with metal bands, Tsangarides recorded songs for artists of other musical genres, like singer/songwriter Joan Armatrading, pop star Tom Jones, goth rockers the Lords of the New Church, Killing Joke and keyboardist Jan Hammer. In 1987, he remixed the song "Never Let Me Down Again" by new wave band Depeche Mode for release as a single.

The 1990s saw Tsangarides still at work with metal bands like Exodus, Overkill, Judas Priest again with the album Painkiller, Japanese band Loudness and guitar virtuoso Yngwie Malmsteen, but he also produced for British gothic rock act the Sisters of Mercy and the alternative rock groups the Tragically Hip and Concrete Blonde. For the latter band, he also produced and engineered the hit single "Joey" in 1990. In 1999, Tsangarides collaborated as a performer and songwriter with Shin Hae-chul in the techno/metal act Monocrom. They made one album and did an arena tour in Shin's native Korea.

At the beginning of the 2000s, Tsangarides had his own music company called Rainmaker Music, which included a recording studio with the same name in South London. He later opened another studio called The Dump in Kenley, Surrey, which operated until January 2006. Among others, New Model Army, Leanne Harte, Winters Bane  and Glyder recorded there.

In 2006, Tsangarides opened a new recording facility, Ecology Room Studios in Kent, England, where he went on producing new and established acts on lower budgets than in corporate studios. The Strawbs, Mountain, Steeleye Span, the Quireboys, Biomechanical, Spit Like This, Savage Messiah and many other bands recorded at his new facility. LunarMile, whose members include Toni-Marie Iommi (daughter of Black Sabbath's Tony Iommi) and Alex Hill (son of Judas Priest's Ian Hill), recorded there in June 2007.

Tsangarides is featured in Sacha Gervasi's documentary film Anvil! The Story of Anvil, released in 2009, while at work on the album This Is Thirteen, which Anvil recorded at Ecology Room Studios.

Between 2010-2013, Tsangarides collaborated with the Band Complete team at SAE Athens. Tsangarides acted as the recording-sessions mentor, supervisor, recording engineer, and producer. Band Complete engaged students in several areas of creative media production/publishing and the professional life of a music band. Overall, Tsangarides mentored three intakes and engineered/produced EPs for Puta Volcano, Stonebringer, and Skinny Whales.

In February 2012, Tsangarides announced details of a new record label Dark Lord Records formed with the Strawbs frontman Dave Cousins.  The first release on the new label was Normalityville Horror by Spit Like This on 21 May.

Tsangarides occasionally played guitar and performed live with the metal band Exmore / More 2012.

He died of pneumonia and heart failure on 7 January 2018, aged 61.

Technical accomplishments
Tsangarides is known for a guitar recording technique called "the vortex", which he first used when recording the guitar of John Goodsall for the Brand X album Moroccan Roll in 1977. He later refined the technique, which gives to the recordings a random panning effect similar to a reverb, but obtained through a particular placement of microphones.

Bands worked with
Source:

 The Amorettes
 Angra
 Anthem
 Anvil
 Aqualung
 Joan Armatrading
 Barón Rojo
 Biomechanical
 Bitches Sin
 Black Acid Souls
 Black Sabbath
 Blanco Diablo
 Blind Tiger
 Kevin Borich
 Brand X
 Briar Rose
 Broon
 Ethan Brosh
 Capital Sun
 Chemicals of Democracy
 Colosseum II
 The Comsat Angels
 Concrete Blonde
 Sara Craig
 Crowning Glory
 Dave Cousins
 Sara Craig
 Delfins
 Depeche Mode
 Desolation Angels
 Bruce Dickinson
 Exmore / More 2012
 Exodus
 Fear of 
God
 Fortnox ( Epic) 
 Samantha Fox
 Ian Gillan
 Girl
 Girlschool
 Glyder
 Hardwicke Circus
 Helloween
 Hex A D
 The Human League
 Incinery
 Jailcat
 Japan
 Tom Jones
 Judas Priest
 Killing Joke
 King Diamond
 King Lizard
 The Lords of the New Church
 Loudness
 Magnum
 Yngwie Malmsteen
 Mama's Boys
 Matisse
 Matt Mays and El Torpedo
  Nick Miller
 Mimas
 Money
 Gary Moore
 Mountain
 New Model Army
 N.EX.T
 Nightlord
 Ozzy Osbourne
 Gilbert O'Sullivan
 Overkill
 Praying Mantis
Prowler (band)
 The Prime Movers
 Quartz
 The Quireboys
 Rock Goddess
 Revival
 Savage Messiah
 Shin Hae-chul/Monocrom 
 Sinner
 The Sisters of Mercy
 Slave Raider
 Spider
 Spit Like This
 Steeleye Span
 Stella Maris
 Stonebringer
 Strawbs
 John Sykes
 Therapy?
 Thin Lizzy
 ThisGirl
 Barbara Thompson
 Tigertailz
 TNT
 Tokyo Blade
 The Tragically Hip
 Tygers of Pan Tang
 UFO
 Virgil & the Accelerators
 Winters Bane
 Wretched Soul
 Y&T

See also 
 List of record producers

References

External links 
 Chris Tsangarides on Encyclopedia Metallum
 Chris Tsangarides on Discogs

1956 births
2018 deaths
British audio engineers
British record producers
British people of Greek Cypriot descent
Alumni of the Royal Academy of Music
Deaths from pneumonia in the United Kingdom
20th-century British businesspeople